Adhemarius fulvescens is a species of moth in the family Sphingidae. It was described by Gustav Adolf Closs in 1915, and is known from Mexico, Guatemala, Costa Rica and north-central Nicaragua.

Adults are on wing in May, from July to August and again from October to November in Nicaragua.

References

Adhemarius
Moths described in 1915
Moths of North America